Rapture TV was a previously free-to-air satellite television station (although now an exclusively online channel) operated from the United Kingdom,  founded in 1997. Focusing mostly on electronic dance music and extreme sports, it is notable for the number of times it has "failed" financially only to be relaunched.

History
The channel was initially launched by the United Business Media group as a cable television channel on 22 November 1997. Due to common UBM ownership, the channel shared facilities with and was broadcast from the Anglia Television studios in Norwich. The channel was later carried free-to-view on the analogue transponder of FilmFour on Astra 1A at weekends, and eventually used this transponder full-time, until closing its analogue service on 12 December 1999. Very shortly before this, on 27 October 1999, the channel had moved to digital broadcasting via Sky Digital, where it launched as a general entertainment channel on EPG channel 187.

A notable feature of the station during this time was its "Mouse Cam", broadcast as a time filler when the station was off-air. This featured some mice in a Habitrail-like setup, with shots changing between cameras. The station also featured one of the first SMS-based request shows during this era. A launch to ITV Digital was planned at this time, but never came to completion.

The channel had never been profitable, and its average audiences were in the region of 100,000. UBM placed the channel on the market in 2001, was unable to find a buyer, and closed on 31 October 2001, with the loss of 46 jobs and debts estimated at £12 million, notably playing "Rapture" by iio as its final track over pictures of the station staff. During this time, it had refocused almost entirely on dance music, and was moved to EPG channel 458 in the music section.

R.Muzik moved to Capital One the next day on 1st November 2001, when it was renamed Mixmag TV. The programme was now produced by Music Box, and later Sunset + Vine.

In April 2002, the channels assets were bought by Edinburgh based independent production company Power TV, who had previously produced some shows for the channel. A temporary relaunch occurred - to EPG #232 - in June 2002, and lasted until August of the same year, when problems caused it to close again.

It was again relaunched in May 2003 on EPG channel 265. Recurring financial issues, aggravated by the technical failure of a premium-rate SMS service on the channel which would have brought in funding, and various other problems, left the channel in a precarious state. By April 2004 it was running on an almost autopilot, having moved (again) to EPG channel 205, with a somewhat randomised playlist of a few videos, reruns of old club nights over night, and extreme sports in the day.

In July 2004, the channel ran out of money terminally, a potential purchase by Video Interactive Television fell through and the channel ceased to broadcast and was removed from the Sky EPG. Plans for its relaunch were kept active, however. Its named holding company, Rapture TV (Scotland), which was incorporated in 2002, was wound up in 2005.

The story of Rapture TV has been a defining one for the birth of digital satellite. With the increase in capacity, and lower cost base, a whole host of such channels were launched, with most languishing at unpopular EPG locations, or even outside the EPG. Although the satellite TV became "cheaper" to enter, many operators rushed onto the scene without a viable business plan that would make money. Unlike other such channels, Rapture TV has refused to disappear.

2005 Relaunch
The channel relaunched on Sky Digital broadcasting from Eutelsat 28A on 14 November 2005, after some time awaiting an EPG number from Sky - a period of time which was deemed excessive enough to warrant a complaint to OFCOM by the channel.

The re-launched Rapture TV showed clubbing and extreme sports, programming that the channel is well known for, as well as new programmes from genres such as comedy and drama. In addition, programmes focusing on computer games and technology, including Cybernet (previously seen on ITV) and G@mers, an in-house production were added to the lineup. The channel also broadcast feature films. Dance music content, which made up much of the channels output on previous editions, was retained, with the addition of Underground, a hardcore dance show presented by Jon Doe of CLSM.

The channel launched a broadband simulcast in March 2006, and claims to be the first UK based entertainment channel to launch such a service.

In September 2006, Rapture lodged a complaint with OFCOM against BSkyB, claiming "BSkyB is charging excessively high fees for the supply of a EPG service on the UK's only DSat platform". This was furthered on 23 February 2007 with Rapture submitting further evidence to OFCOM in regard to what they felt was "Bullying" on the part of BSkyB. 
The complaint was furthered just under a week before Virgin Media removed BSkyB's Basic channels from their service after an unsuccessful round of negotiations in regard to the worth of the channels. Ofcom rejected this complaint.

2007
On 19 March 2007, BSkyB decided to remove Rapture TV from their EPG based on the fact that Rapture TV had failed to pay for a slot in the EPG. Rapture TV was available on the BSkyB platform on channel 193.

On 25 April 2007, Rapture published a statement that outlined the temporary cut off of the channel, whilst giving details of upgrading the site with more content and on-demand video.

On 9 May 2007 a case brought by Rapture TV to Ofcom concerning the BSkyB EPG (Electronic Programme Guide) went to Appeal at the Competition Commission Appeals Tribunal (CAT).  The hearing was heard on 18 and 19 December 2007.

Rapture TV Live
On 12 June 2007, Rapture relaunched its live stream, which initially broadcast R:Muzik 24/7 but now also broadcasts programmes from the Rapture archive. A week beforehand the stream was trialled unsuccessfully using peercast. This current free stream is a temporary measure, and in the future may be replaced with a high quality paid service. In October 2007, a new feature was added enabling viewers to select music videos to play on the live stream for free via the Rapture website.

2008
On 31 March 2008, the Competition Commission Appeals Tribunal released their judgement, in which they unanimously dismissed the appeal.

Rapture continued to be very vocally critical of Sky and the various related Murdoch companies on public forums for some time before focusing their efforts elsewhere.

2009
Rapture attempted to restart their satellite broadcast presence in an audio-only capacity by broadcasting several shows for Satellite radio broadcaster RTI (Sky channel 0195).  These broadcasts took place on 17 and 24 January 2009.

RTI closed down shortly after this.

References

External links
Rapture TV
Rapture TV announces relaunch plans
Rapture claims simulcast first
Press Release regarding complaint against BskyB
Rapture TV Streaming Service

Television channels and stations established in 1997
Dance music television channels
Television channels in the United Kingdom